The Bass Performance Hall (also known as Bass Hall) is a performing arts venue, located in Fort Worth, Texas.

Overview

The hall was first suggested by pianist Van Cliburn to philanthropist Nancy Lee Bass and her husband, Perry Richardson Bass.

It was built with limestone and designed by David M. Schwarz of Architectural Services, Inc. in 1998. An  dome, painted by Scott and Stuart Gentling, tops the Founders Concert Theater. The façade features two  angels sculpted by Marton Varo from Texas limestone.

It seats 2,056 people. Built as a multi-purpose facility, the Hall is able to house symphony, ballet, opera, stage, musicals, and rock concerts. It is also now the permanent home to the Fort Worth Symphony Orchestra, Texas Ballet Theater, Fort Worth Opera, the Van Cliburn International Piano Competition, and Cliburn Concerts. Performing Arts Fort Worth, which manages the Hall, also hosts its own performances here, including national touring Broadway productions and a family series.

In 2001, the adjacent Maddox-Muse Center officially opened; and with it, the new Van Cliburn Recital Hall and the McDavid Studio with 220 seats  (renamed in 2006 from McNair Rehearsal Studio). Also housed within Maddox-Muse Center are offices for Performing Arts Fort Worth, the non-profit organization that oversees management of the Hall, and the Fort Worth Symphony Orchestra.

Fleetwood Mac guitarist/vocalist Lindsey Buckingham's performance at the hall on January 27, 2007 was recorded on his live album, Live at the Bass Performance Hall, which was released a year later on March 25, 2008.

See also
 List of concert halls

External links
 Bass Performance Hall official website

References

Concert halls in Texas
Opera houses in Texas
Music venues in Texas
Theatres in Texas
Culture of Fort Worth, Texas
Buildings and structures in Fort Worth, Texas
Texas classical music
Economy of Fort Worth, Texas
Performing arts centers in Texas
Tourist attractions in Fort Worth, Texas
1998 establishments in Texas
Theatres completed in 1998
Music venues completed in 1998
David M. Schwarz buildings
New Classical architecture